Walter Frederick Lathlain (2 December 1905 – 13 December 1971) was an Australian rules footballer who played with Hawthorn in the Victorian Football League (VFL).

Notes

External links 

1905 births
1971 deaths
Australian rules footballers from Melbourne
Hawthorn Football Club players
Camberwell Football Club players
People from Werribee, Victoria